Sartirana may refer to:
 Sartirana Lomellina, a village and commune in the Italian province of Pavia
 A locality within the municipal boundaries of Merate, a town in Italian province of Lecco
 Lago di Sartirana, a lake near Merate